Hastings Senior High School can refer to:

Hastings Senior High School (Nebraska) in Hastings, Nebraska
Hastings Senior High School (Minnesota) in Hastings, Minnesota